Hugh McAlister may refer to:

 Alice Alison Lide, American author who wrote under the pseudonym "Hugh McAlister," likely with her sister Margaret Alison Johansen and possibly on her own
 Margaret Alison Johansen, American author and Alice Alison Lide's sister who wrote under the pseudonym "Hugh McAlister," likely with Lide and possibly on her own